Burley Lewis Bearden (August 28, 1917 – January 18, 1997) was an American football coach.  He served as the head football coach at the University of Texas at Arlington from 1966 until 1970, compiling record of 27–24.  In 1967, he led his team to victory in the Pecan Bowl, beating North Dakota State 13–0.  The school discontinued its football team after completion of the 1985 season.

Bearden was born on August 28, 1917.

Head coaching record

References

External links
 

1917 births
1997 deaths
Texas–Arlington Mavericks football coaches
People from Mansfield, Texas
People from Waxahachie, Texas